Zaraah Clover Abrahams (born 7 January 1987) is an English actress and voiceover artist. She is known for her roles as Magda in Girls in Love from 2003 to 2005, Michaela White in the BBC school-based drama series Waterloo Road from 2008 to 2010, Joanne Jackson in the ITV soap opera Coronation Street from 2005 to 2007 and Chelsea Fox in the BBC soap opera EastEnders from 2020 onwards. She then competed in the third series of the ITV talent show Dancing on Ice, and later returned as a contestant for the All Star series in 2014.

Early life
Abrahams was born in a hospital in Lambeth, London of Iraqi and Barbadian descent on her mother's side and of Jamaican descent on her father's side. She grew up in Brixton, South London and is the eldest of 3 siblings. She attended the Italia Conti Academy of Theatre Arts for her secondary education, landing the role of Magda in the TV Adaptation of Jacqueline Wilson's Girls in Love while still a pupil there. At the age of 17, she left London to pursue a career in acting in Manchester after landing the role of Joanne Jackson in Coronation Street.

Career
Abrahams previously starred as Magda in the CITV show Girls in Love and as Joanne Jackson in the ITV soap Coronation Street. In 2008, she joined the cast of Waterloo Road in a recurring role as student Michaela White. The character became part of the core cast for the fourth series in 2009 and remained with the show until her exit at the end of the fifth series in 2010. She starred in the 2013 short film Black Girl in Paris on HBO which was nominated for short film of the year, and where she was seen by Spike Lee. In 2014, Lee cast her as the female lead, Ganja Hightower in the Ganja & Hess homage Da Sweet Blood of Jesus, her first Hollywood film. In 2015 Abrams moved to New York City to film American television drama The Knick.

In 2008, Abrahams participated in ITV's celebrity skating series Dancing on Ice, as a replacement for the injured Michael Underwood. Her partner was skater Fred Palascak. The pair finished in third place. In 2015, she joined the cast of the Cinemax series The Knick, a medical drama directed by Steven Soderbergh, set around a New York hospital in the early 20th century. She portrayed the role of Opal. In October 2020, it was announced that Abrahams would be taking over the role of Chelsea Fox in the BBC soap EastEnders. Her first episode as Chelsea was broadcast on 25 December 2020.

Filmography

Awards and nominations

References

External links
 

1987 births
21st-century English actresses
Actresses from London
Alumni of the Italia Conti Academy of Theatre Arts
Black British actresses
British actresses of Asian descent
English child actresses
English people of Barbadian descent
English people of Jamaican descent
English people of Iraqi descent
English television actresses
English soap opera actresses
Living people